The 1935 Harvard Crimson football team was an American football team that represented Harvard University as an independent during the 1935 college football season. In its first season under head coach Dick Harlow, the team compiled a 3–5 record and  outscored opponents by a total of 107 to 89. The team played its home games at Harvard Stadium in Boston.

Schedule

References

Harvard
Harvard Crimson football seasons
Harvard Crimson football
1930s in Boston